The 2006–07 Northern Premier League season was the 39th in the history of the Northern Premier League, a football competition in England. Teams were divided into two divisions; the Premier and the First. After this season, Division One was split into two leagues: the Northern Premier League Division One North and the Northern Premier League Division One South.

Premier Division 

The Premier Division featured five new clubs:

 Fleetwood Town promoted as runner-up from NPL Division One
 Grantham Town transferred from Southern League Premier Division
 Hednesford Town, relegated from the Conference North
 Kendal Town, promoted via play-offs from NPL Division One
 Mossley, promoted as champions from NPL Division One

League table

Results

Play-offs 
The Premier Division play-offs saw the second to fifth placed sides in the Division compete for one place in the Conference North.

Locations

Division One 

Division One featured seven new clubs:

 Bradford Park Avenue, relegated from the NPL Premier Division
 Wakefield, relegated from the NPL Premier Division
 Cammell Laird promoted as champions from North West Counties League Division One
 Skelmersdale United promoted as runners-up from North West Counties League Division One
 Alsager Town promoted as third place from North West Counties League Division One
 Buxton promoted as champions from Northern Counties East League Premier Division
 Harrogate Railway Athletic promoted as third place from Northern Counties East League Premier Division

League table

Results

Play-offs 
The First Division play-offs saw the second to fifth placed sides in the First Division compete for a place in the Premier Division.

Cup results
Challenge Cup: Teams from both divisions.

Fleetwood Town 1–0 Matlock Town

President's Cup: 'Plate' competition for losing teams in the NPL Cup.

Buxton 3–1 Wakefield

Chairman's Cup: 'Plate' competition for losing teams in the NPL Cup.

Guiseley 2–1 Cammell Laird

Peter Swales Shield: Between Champions of NPL Premier Division and Champions of NPL First Division.

Burscough 3–1 Fleetwood Town

External links 
 Unibond League Premier Division Table 2006-07
 Unibond League Premier Division Results 2006–07
 Unibond League First Division Table 2006-07
 Unibond League First Division play-off Results 2006–07

Northern Premier League seasons
7